Hugo Helmig (24 July 1998 – 23 November 2022) was a Danish singer-songwriter.

Early life
Helmig grew up in Aarhus, the son of musician Thomas Helmig and supermodel Renée Simonsen. He had three siblings.

Career
Helmig released his debut single, Please Don’t Lie in 2017, which peaked at number one on the Danish airplay chart and number three in Germany. The following year he released the single Wild which spent five weeks at number one in Denmark and charted elsewhere in Europe, including Germany.

In February 2019, Helmig was signed internationally with AWAL, and later the same year he was nominated for a Music Moves Europe Talent Award.

According to the Danish Broadcasting Corporation, Helmig was the third most profitable Danish artist internationally in 2020.

Death
On 23 November 2022, Helmig died at his apartment in Copenhagen, Denmark, at the age of 24. He was buried at Nordre Cemetery in his hometown of Aarhus.

References

1998 births
2022 deaths
21st-century Danish  male singers
Danish  male singer-songwriters
Singers from Aarhus